Windy Ridge is a residential town in the Western region of Ghana. It shares a boundary with Takoradi   the regional capital. The town under the Takoradi constituency of Ghana.

Boundary
The town is bounded to the east and south and west by Takoradi and on the North by Effiakuma and east by Tanokrom, Takoradi

References

Populated places in the Western Region (Ghana)